Rom Bahadur Thapa (1924–1983) is the first Inspector General of Nepal Police from the Magar ethnic group. Before joining the Nepal Police, he had been a Physical Training Instructor at the Military Academy in Burma (Myanmar).  He had a reputation as a great war hero (of Burma) before joining Nepal Police. He was awarded the Burma Gallantry Medal for his heroic actions during World War II.

He is known to have been one of the only two officers to remain IGP for a period of 6 years, the other officer being his successor, Khadgajeet Baral. Rom Bahadur Thapa was appointed Consul General of Calcutta, India by His Majesty's Government after his retirement
from Nepal Police.

Nepal lost this extraordinary visionary man to cancer at a young age of 59 on 26 October 1983. He is survived by his wife, four sons, a daughter, twelve grandchildren and three great grandsons and one great granddaughter.

References

Nepalese police officers
Chiefs of police
Inspectors General of Police (Nepal)
1924 births
1983 deaths